Mezban, locally known as Mejjan (Chittagonian dialect: মেজ্জান) is a popular social festival held in the Chittagong region of Bangladesh. Historically Mezban is a traditional regional feast that serves the famous Mezbani meal consisting of steamed white rice and hot beef, usually along with other dishes like 'chonar daal' or curry of mung bean and beef fat chunks, 'nolar kanzi' or beef bone marrow soup, and the kala bhuna or dried beef with onions. The feast is held on occasions such as death anniversary, birth anniversary, launching of a new business, the birth of a child, marriage, aqiqah and circumcision, ear piercing of girls among other few.  The invitation of the Mezban ceremony generally remains open for all and various people to different places and neighborhoods convey the invitation for the feast. The invitation cards are printed and distributed among the guests only in urban areas. Usually, the consumption of food at Mezbani takes place from morning to afternoon.

Etymology and history
Mezban is commonly called Mejjan in the local language of Chittagong. The word "Mezban" is ultimately of Persian origin and means host, and "Mezbani" means hosting or arranging a feast for the guests In the neighbouring Noakhali region to its north, Mezbani is popularly and widely known as Zeafat.

Various poets and litterateurs from Chittagong region have composed numerous rhymes, poems, stories, and essays on the theme of Mezban, such as:

"Kalamanya Dhalamanya
Aner Ada Jira Dhanya
Ar Na Lagey Ilish-Ghanya
Goru Khashi Butor Dailor
Bosta Dekha Jay –
Mezbani Khati Ay…."

Cooking techniques

Traditionally Mezban is a beef-dominated meal and a symbol of social prestige. The rich and the poor arrange feasts on various occasions as much as circumstances allow them. It has a prominent style of cooking and proper Mezban meat demands a certain skill; for example:

 Spicy beef cooked with a lot of red chilies
 Less hot but sour and spicy broth made from the tubular bone of a cow, which is known as Nawla kanji
 A kind of pulse which is cooked after peeling the skin of beans and then crushing them; it is called Bhuna dal
 Food of slightly pungent taste made from chick-pea pulse, bone, fat, and meat.

Hindu tradition
In the middle of the 18th century, Shamsher Gazi, who was a governor in the northern region of Chittagong (then known as Islamabad) in Feni district and Zamindar of Tripura, Chakla-Roshnabad dug a large pond after the name of his mother Koyara Begum and arranged a feast by bringing many fish from the neighboring ponds as well as those in Nizampur area of Chittagong. Fish is used instead of beef while cooking Mezban in Hindu tradition, as eating beef in forbidden in Hinduism. Since the Hindu community of Chittagong organises Mezbani each year under the banner of "Chittagong Parishad", with curries made from fish, vegetable and dried fish.

Celebrations
The practice of Mezbani started in the capital city Dhaka in the late 1960s, when National Professor Nurul Islam became the president of Chittagong Association, Dhaka for the term of 1968 to 1983.

It has also proliferated in Sylhet, Khulna. As we as in various countries of Europe, Americas, and Asia, by the Bangladeshi diaspora, especially by the Chittagongian community.

References

Culture in Chittagong
Chittagonian cuisine